van Westerhout or Van Westerhout is a Dutch surname.

People with this name include:

 Balthasar van Westerhout (1656–1728), Flemish printmaker and painter
 Arnold van Westerhout (1651–1725), Flemish printmaker, painter, draughtsman and engraver
 Niccolò van Westerhout (1857–1898), Italian composer

Dutch-language surnames
Surnames of Dutch origin
Toponymic surnames